Rafael Radikovich Khisamov (born 19 August 1987) is a former Russian professional football player.

Club career
He played two seasons in the Russian Football National League for FC KAMAZ Naberezhnye Chelny.

External links
 
 

1987 births
People from Almetyevsk
Living people
Russian footballers
Association football defenders
FC KAMAZ Naberezhnye Chelny players
FC Orenburg players
FC Zenit-Izhevsk players
Sportspeople from Tatarstan